Dana Marton is an American author of over fifty novels that have been translated into over a dozen languages and sold more than two million copies worldwide.  A New York Times and USA Today bestselling author, she writes fast-paced stories about strong women and honorable men who fight side by side for justice and survival.

Writing 
Marton won the Daphne du Maurier award in 2005 for her fourth book, Camouflage Heart.  In 2008, her book Tall, Dark and Lethal was nominated for the prestigious RITA Award.  Deathscape reached the #1 spot on Amazon's Romantic Suspense Bestseller list in 2012.  Her fantasy novel Reluctant Concubine held the #1 spot in its Amazon category for over a month in 2015.  She has written over twenty five novels for Harlequin Intrigue.

Kirkus Reviews calls her writing "compelling and honest." Her writing has been featured in the USA Today 'Happy Ever After' section and acclaimed as "must-read romantic suspense".

Bibliography

HARLEQUIN TITLES
Shadow Soldier (October 2004) 
Secret Soldier (January 2005) 
The Sheik's Safety (July 2005) 
Camouflage Heart (October 2005)   (Daphne du Maurier Award of Excellence)
Rogue Soldier (February 2006) 
Protective Measures (May 2006) 
Bridal Op (August 2006) 
Undercover Sheik (December 2006) 
Secret Contract (April 2007)   (RT Book Reviews Top Pick)
Ironclad Cover (May 2007)   (RT Book Reviews Top Pick)
My Bodyguard (August  2007) 
Intimate Details (September 2007) 
Sheik Seduction (January 2008) 
72 Hours (April 2008) 
Sheik Protector (September 2008)   (RT Book Reviews Top Pick)
Tall, Dark And Lethal (December 2008)   (Rita Award Nominee)
Desert Ice Daddy (March 2009) 
Saved By The Monarch (May 2009)   (RT Book Reviews Top Pick)
Royal Protocol (June 2009) 
The Socialite and the Bodyguard (January 2010) 
Stranded with the Prince (May 2010) 
Royal Captive (June 2010) 
The Spy Who Saved Christmas (October 2010) 
The Black Sheep Sheik (September 2011)  (RT Book Reviews Top Pick)
Last Spy Standing (January 2012) 
Spy Hard (June 2012) 
The Spy Wore Spurs (July 2012) 
Three Cowboys (December 2012) 
HQ:TEXAS SERIES
Most Eligible Spy (September 2013) 
My Spy (October 2013)   (RT Book Reviews Top Pick)
Spy In The Saddle (October 2013) 

NON-FICTION
Many Genres, One Craft: Lessons in Writing Popular Fiction (May 2011) 

AGENTS UNDER FIRE SERIES
Guardian Agent (June 2011) 
Avenging Agent (August 2011) 
Warrior Agent (October 2011) 
Agents Under Fire (novella trilogy) (December 2011)  ASIN: B006Q2V2J4

BROSLIN CREEK SERIES
Deathwatch (Broslin Creek #1) (August 2013) 
Deathscape (Broslin Creek #2) (November 2012) 
Deathtrap (Broslin Creek #3) (June 2013) 
Deathblow (Broslin Creek #4) (December 2013) 
Broslin Bride (Broslin Creek #5) (June 2014) 
Deathwish (Broslin Creek #6)  (November 2014) 
When You Return To Me (Broslin Creek #6)  (November 2015)  ASIN: B018LHEVGW
Broslin Creek Boxed Set (Books 1-3) (November 2013) 
Broslin Creek Boxed Set (Books 4-6) (May 2017)  ASIN: B0719KJBQC

PERSONNEL RECOVERY SERIES
Forced Disappearance (November 2014) 
Flash Fire (November 2015)  (RITA AWARD Romantic Suspense 2016)
Girl in the Water October (2016) 

MISSION RECOVERY SERIES
Silent Threat (January 2018) 
Threat of Danger (June 2018) 

OMNIBUS
Dangerous Attraction Boxed Set (November 2013) ASIN: B00FSY0XGY (with Rebecca York, Patricia Rosemoor, Kaylea Cross, Sharon Hamilton, Jill Sanders, Toni Anderson, Debra Burroughs, Marie Astor, Lori Ryan)

EPIC FANTASY
Reluctant Concubine (March 2015)   (Previously published as The Third Scroll in 2011)
Accidental Sorceress (March 2015) 
Guardian Queen (January 2019)

References

Year of birth missing (living people)
Seton Hill University alumni
Living people
American romantic fiction writers